John Beaumont may refer to:

John of Beaumont (1288–1356), Dutch nobleman
John Beaumont, 2nd Baron Beaumont (aft. 1317–1342), Baron Beaumont
John Beaumont, 4th Baron Beaumont (1361–1396), English soldier in the Hundred Years' War, Lord Warden of the Cinque Ports
John Beaumont, 1st Viscount Beaumont (c. 1409–1460), Viscount Beaumont
John Beaumont (judge) (fl. 1550), master of the rolls
John Beaumont (by 1508-58/64), MP for Leicester, Bossiney and Liverpool
Sir John Beaumont, 1st Baronet (1583–1627), English poet
John Beaumont (died 1701), English politician, MP for Nottingham in 1685–89 and Hastings in 1689–90
John Beaumont (geologist) (c. 1650–1731), English geologist
John Beaumont (cricketer) (1855–1920), English fast bowler for Surrey County Cricket Club and Yorkshire County Cricket Club
John Beaumont (sport shooter) (1924–2000), American Olympic shooter
John Michael Beaumont (1927–2016), Seigneur of Sark from 1974
John Ralph Beaumont (1927–1992), Rhodesian politician
John Thomas Barber Beaumont (1774–1841), British army officer, painter, author, and philanthropist
John Erlick Beaumont (born 1986), Honduran footballer, see 2011–12 Honduran Liga Nacional

See also
Beaumont (disambiguation)